Frank Mays Hull (born December 9, 1948) is a senior United States circuit judge of the United States Court of Appeals for the Eleventh Circuit.

Education
Hull received her Bachelor of Arts degree from Randolph-Macon Woman's College (now Randolph College) in 1970. She received her Juris Doctor from Emory University School of Law in 1973. She graduated cum laude, Order of the Coif, and was on the Law Review.

Legal career
Hull was a law clerk to Judge Elbert P. Tuttle of the United States Court of Appeals for the Fifth Circuit from 1973 to 1974. She was an associate attorney with the law firm Powell, Goldstein, Frazer & Murphy, in Atlanta, Georgia from 1974 to 1980 and a partner there from 1980 to 1984. She served as a Judge for the State Court of Fulton County, Georgia from 1984 to 1990, as a Judge for the Superior Court of Fulton County, Georgia from 1990 to 1994.

Federal judicial service
Hull was nominated by Bill Clinton on February 9, 1994, to a seat on the United States District Court for the Northern District of Georgia vacated by Marvin Herman Shoob. She was confirmed by the Senate on May 6, 1994, and received commission on May 9, 1994. Her service terminated on October 2, 1997, due to elevation to the Eleventh Circuit.

She was nominated by President Bill Clinton on June 18, 1997, for the United States Court of Appeals for the Eleventh Circuit to a seat vacated by Phyllis A. Kravitch, who assumed senior status. She was confirmed by the United States Senate by a 96–0 vote on September 4, 1997. She received her commission on September 18, 1997. She assumed senior status on December 31, 2017.

References

External links

1948 births
Emory University School of Law alumni
Georgia (U.S. state) lawyers
Georgia (U.S. state) state court judges
Judges of the United States Court of Appeals for the Eleventh Circuit
Judges of the United States District Court for the Northern District of Georgia
Living people
People from Augusta, Georgia
United States court of appeals judges appointed by Bill Clinton
United States district court judges appointed by Bill Clinton
20th-century American judges
21st-century American judges
20th-century American women judges
21st-century American women judges